is a Japanese football player. He plays for Gamba Osaka.

Career
Tomoki Kamioka joined Gamba Osaka in 2016. On March 13, he debuted in J3 League (v YSCC Yokohama).

Reserves performance

Last Updated: 31 December 2016

References

External links

1998 births
Living people
Association football people from Osaka Prefecture
Japanese footballers
J1 League players
J3 League players
Gamba Osaka players
Gamba Osaka U-23 players
Association football defenders